Spasskoye , rural localities in Russia, may refer to:

 Arkhangelsk Oblast
 Spasskoye, Arkhangelsk Oblast, a selo

 Bashkortostan
 Spasskoye, Iglinsky District, Bashkortostan, a village
 Spasskoye, Sterlitamaksky District, Bashkortostan, a village

 Ivanovo Oblast
 Spasskoye, Komsomolsky District, Ivanovo Oblast, a village
 Spasskoye, Privolzhsky District, Ivanovo Oblast, a selo
 Spasskoye, Yuzhsky District, Ivanovo Oblast, a village

 Kaluga Oblast
 Spasskoye, Kaluga Oblast, a village

 Kirov Oblast
 Spasskoye, Bogorodsky District, Kirov Oblast, a selo
 Spasskoye, Kotelnichsky District, Kirov Oblast, a selo
 Spasskoye, Slobodskoy District, Kirov Oblast, a village

  Kostroma Oblast
 Spasskoye, Kostroma Oblast, a village

 Kurgan Oblast
 Spasskoye, Kurgan Oblast, a village

 Kursk Oblast
 Spasskoye, Kursk Oblast, a village

 Lipetsk Oblast
 Spasskoye, Stanovlyansky District, Lipetsk Oblast, a selo
 Spasskoye, Volovsky District, Lipetsk Oblast, a selo

 Republic of Mordovia
 Spasskoye, Bolsheignatovsky District, Republic of Mordovia, a selo
 Spasskoye, Ruzayevsky District, Republic of Mordovia, a selo

 Moscow Oblast
 Spasskoye, Klinsky District, Moscow Oblast, a village
 Spasskoye, Leninsky District, Moscow Oblast, a village
 Spasskoye, Odintsovsky District, Moscow Oblast, a village
 Spasskoye, Stupinsky District, Moscow Oblast, a selo

 Nizhny Novgorod Oblast
 Spasskoye, Borsky District, Nizhny Novgorod Oblast, a selo
 Spasskoye, Shatkovsky District, Nizhny Novgorod Oblast, a selo
 Spasskoye, Spassky District, Nizhny Novgorod Oblast, a selo
 Spasskoye, Vetluzhsky District, Nizhny Novgorod Oblast, a selo

 Novgorod Oblast
 Spasskoye, Novgorod Oblast, a village
 Spasskoye, Omsk Oblast, a selo

 Orenburg Oblast
 Spasskoye, Saraktashsky District, Orenburg Oblast, a selo
 Spasskoye, Sorochinsky District, Orenburg Oblast, a selo

 Oryol Oblast
 Spasskoye, Korsakovsky District, Oryol Oblast, a selo
 Spasskoye, Mtsensky District, Oryol Oblast, a selo
 Spasskoye, Saburovsky Selsoviet, Orlovsky District, Oryol Oblast, a selo
 Spasskoye, Spasskoy Rural Settlement, Orlovsky District, Oryol Oblast, a selo
 Spasskoye, Sverdlovsky District, Oryol Oblast, a village

 Primorsky Krai
 Spasskoye, Primorsky Krai, a selo

 Pskov Oblast
 Spasskoye, Pskov Oblast, a village

 Ryazan Oblast
 Spasskoye, Ryazan Oblast, a selo

 Samara Oblast
 Spasskoye, Privolzhsky District, Samara Oblast, a selo
 Spasskoye, Sergiyevsky District, Samara Oblast, a selo

 Saratov Oblast
 Spasskoye, Saratov Oblast, a selo

 Smolensk Oblast
 Spasskoye, Smolensk Oblast, a village

 Stavropol Krai
 Spasskoye, Stavropol Krai, a selo

 Tambov Oblast
 Spasskoye, Tambov Oblast, a selo

 Tatarstan
 Spasskoye, Tatarstan, a selo

 Tula Oblast
 Spasskoye, Bogoroditsky District, Tula Oblast, a village
 Spasskoye, Kurkinsky District, Tula Oblast, a village
 Spasskoye, Novomoskovsky District, Tula Oblast, a selo
 Spasskoye, Odoyevsky District, Tula Oblast, a selo
 Spasskoye, Plavsky District, Tula Oblast, a selo
 Spasskoye, Tyoplo-Ogaryovsky District, Tula Oblast, a selo
 Spasskoye, Lipitsky Rural Settlement, Chernsky District, Tula Oblast, a village
 Spasskoye, Turgenevsky Rural Settlement, Chernsky District, Tula Oblast, a selo
 Spasskoye, Lazarevsky Rural Settlement, Shchyokinsky District, Tula Oblast, a selo
 Spasskoye, Yasnopolyansky Rural Settlement, Shchyokinsky District, Tula Oblast, a selo

 Tver Oblast
 Spasskoye, Kalyazinsky District, Tver Oblast, a selo
 Spasskoye, Kashinsky District, Tver Oblast, a village
 Spasskoye, Staritsky District, Tver Oblast, a village

 Vladimir Oblast
 Spasskoye, Bereznikovsky Rural Settlement, Sobinsky District, Vladimir Oblast, a village
 Spasskoye, Rozhdestvensky Rural Settlement, Sobinsky District, Vladimir Oblast, a selo
 Spasskoye, Vladimir Urban District, Vladimir Oblast, a selo
 Spasskoye, Yuryev-Polsky District, Vladimir Oblast, a selo

 Vologda Oblast
 Spasskoye, Gryazovetsky District, Vologda Oblast, a village
 Spasskoye, Biryakovsky Rural Settlement, Sokolsky District, Vologda Oblast, a village
 Spasskoye, Prigorodny Rural Settlement, Sokolsky District, Vologda Oblast, a village
 Spasskoye, Kharovsky District, Vologda Oblast, a selo
 Spasskoye, Syamzhensky District, Vologda Oblast, a village
 Spasskoye, Ust-Kubinsky District, Vologda Oblast, a village
 Spasskoye, Ustyuzhensky District, Vologda Oblast, a village
 Spasskoye, Semiluksky District, Voronezh Oblast, a village
 Spasskoye, Verkhnekhavsky District, Voronezh Oblast, a selo
 Spasskoye, Vologodsky District, Vologda Oblast, a selo

 Yaroslavl Oblast
 Spasskoye, Nekouzsky District, Yaroslavl Oblast, a village
 Spasskoye, Otradnovsky Rural Settlement, Uglichsky District, Yaroslavl Oblast, a selo
 Spasskoye, Slobodsky Rural Settlement, Uglichsky District, Yaroslavl Oblast, a village
 Spasskoye, Yaroslavsky District, Yaroslavl Oblast, a selo